Naushad Samath (born 2 August 1968) is a Sri Lankan former first-class cricketer who played for Kandy Youth Cricket Club.

References

External links
 

1968 births
Living people
Sri Lankan cricketers
Kandy Youth Cricket Club cricketers
Place of birth missing (living people)